Terence Michael McCashin (18 January 1944 – 31 October 2017) was a New Zealand businessman who, together with his wife, founded the country's first craft brewery, McCashin's Brewery, in 1981 in Nelson.

He also represented the country in rugby union, playing seven matches for the All Blacks. 

McCashin owned land in the Port Hills in Christchurch and started negotiating in 2016 with the Summit Road Society, a Port Hills protection society, about the sale of that land.

Personal life
McCashin died on 31 October 2017, aged 73. He is survived by wife Beverley and their five children.

References

1944 births
2017 deaths
New Zealand people of Irish descent
New Zealand brewers
New Zealand international rugby union players
Rugby union players from Palmerston North
Place of death missing
Horowhenua-Kapiti rugby union players
Wellington rugby union players
King Country rugby union players
Marlborough rugby union players
Rugby union hookers
People educated at Horowhenua College